Pompei railway station is a railway station in Pompei, Campania in Italy.

References 

Pompei
Railway stations in Naples
Railway stations in Italy opened in the 21st century